The 2021 American Athletic Conference men's basketball tournament was the postseason men's basketball tournament for the American Athletic Conference. It was held at the Dickies Arena in Fort Worth, Texas from March 11–14.

Seeds
The top five teams received a bye into the quarterfinals. Teams were seeded by record within the conference, with a tiebreaker system to seed teams with identical conference records. Tiebreakers: win–loss record, head-to-head record, record against the highest ranked team outside of the tied teams, record against the second highest ranked team outside of the tied teams, etc.

Schedule

Bracket

See also
2021 American Athletic Conference women's basketball tournament

References

Tournament
American Athletic Conference men's basketball tournament
College sports tournaments in Texas
Basketball competitions in Fort Worth, Texas
American Athletic Conference men's basketball tournament